The 1979 Western Michigan Broncos football team represented Western Michigan University in the Mid-American Conference (MAC) during the 1979 NCAA Division I-A football season.  In their fifth season under head coach Elliot Uzelac, the Broncos compiled a 6–5 record (5–4 against MAC opponents), finished in third place in the MAC, and outscored their opponents, 186 to 120.  The team played its home games at Waldo Stadium in Kalamazoo, Michigan.

The team's statistical leaders included Albert Little with 342 passing yards, Larry Caper with 844 rushing yards, and Tim Clysdale with 207 receiving yards. Tight end Tom Henry and defensive tackle Matt Murphy were the team captains. Murphy also received the team's most outstanding player award.

Schedule

References

Western Michigan
Western Michigan Broncos football seasons
Western Michigan Broncos football